is a multi-purpose stadium in Nagoya, Japan.

It was formerly known as Nagoya City Mizuho Park Athletics Stadium. Since April 2015 it has been called Paloma Mizuho Stadium for the naming rights. It will be used for athletics and ceremonies for the 2026 Asian Games.

It was planned to be used as an Olympic venue in Nagoya’s bid plans for the 1988 Summer Olympics, but Nagoya lost the bid to Seoul, South Korea.

Overview
It is used mostly for football matches and is the part-time home stadium of Nagoya Grampus along with Toyota Stadium. The stadium holds 27,000 people and was built in 1941.

It is distinct from Mizuho Rugby Stadium, which has a capacity of 15,000 and is used mainly for rugby, including Top League games.

Due to renovation as 2026 Asian Games, Stadium has been closed in November 2021 and begin construction at same month.

References

External links 

J. League stadium guide 
Stadium picture

Football venues in Japan
Sports venues in Nagoya
Athletics (track and field) venues in Japan
Nagoya Grampus
Multi-purpose stadiums in Japan
Venues of the 2026 Asian Games
Sports venues completed in 1941
1941 establishments in Japan